Kirana gharana is one of the Indian classical khyal gharanas, and is concerned foremost with perfect intonation of notes (swara).

Singing style
The central concern of the Kirana style is swara, or individual notes, in particular precise tuning and expression of notes. In the Kirana Gayaki (singing style), the individual notes (swaras) of the raga are not just random points in the scale, but independent realms of music capable of horizontal expansion. Emotional pukars in the higher octaves form a part of the musical experience. Another unique feature of this gharana is the intricate and ornate use of the sargam taan (weaving patterns with the notations themselves) introduced by Abdul Karim Khan under influence from the Carnatic classical style.

In the late nineteenth century Abdul Karim Khan and Abdul Wahid Khan revolutionized the khayal gayaki by introducing the vilambit (a slow tempo section) to delineate the structure of the raga note by note.

Frequently performed ragas by musicians of the gharana include Todi, Lalit, Multani, Patdeep, Puriya, Marwa, Shuddha Kalyan, Darbari Kanhara, and Komal-Rishabh Asavari. Marathi thespian Pula Deshpande has pointed out that performers from the Kirana gharana are particularly fond of the Komal Re/Rishabh (or minor second in the western system) note of the classical music scale, a frequent feature of these commonly performed ragas.

History
In the 19th-century the Kirana gharana coalesced around Miyan Bande Ali Khan, a player of the rudra veena. The gharana's style was further developed, and established as one of the prominent styles in modern Indian classical music in the late 19th / early 20th centuries by the musicians Abdul Karim Khan and Abdul Wahid Khan. Abdul Karim Khan was an extremely popular musician, and was thus highly influential in popularizing the gharana. Some trace the gharana's roots back farther to the 13th-century musician Gopal Nayak, a Hindu musician (of the dhrupad style) who later converted to Islamic Sufism and in the process assimilated the predominantly Muslim khyal musical style.

The name of this school of music derives from Kirana or Kairana, a town and tehsil of Shamli District in Uttar Pradesh. It is the birthplace of Abdul Karim Khan (1872–1937), who was one of the most important musicians of this gharana and of Hindustani music in general in the twentieth century. A frequent visitor to the Court of Mysore, Abdul Karim Khan was also influenced by Carnatic music, and roots of the tradition can also be traced back to his great-grandfather Ghulam Ali and Ghulam Maula, the brother of Ghulam Ali.

Owing to the popularity of Abdul Karim Khan, most contemporary Hindustani musicians from Karnataka are exponents of Kirana gharana, and Kirana gharana in turn has absorbed many of the features of the Carnatic tradition. The border region between Karnataka and Maharashtra is particularly associated with the gharana.

The other primary master of the gharana, in the early 20th century, was Abdul Karim Khan's cousin Abdul Wahid Khan who chose to settle at Lahore, Pakistan after the 1947 Partition of British India.

Ancestral pedagogy of Kirana Gharana

This tree details the hereditary lineage of the Kirana Gharana based on several documented accounts.

Lineage

Exponents

19th century
 Sadiq Ali Khan, son and disciple of Ghulam Taki Khan. Associated with Qawwal Bacchon Gharana.
 Bande Ali Khan (1826-1890), son and disciple of Sadiq Ali Khan. Married daughter of Haddu Khan of Gwalior Gharana.

20th century
 Abdul Karim Khan (1872–1937), gharana founder
 Abdul Wahid Khan (1885–1949), cousin of Abdul Karim Khan and gharana co-founder
 Ashique Ali Khan (1948–1999)
 "Proudh Gandharva" Pandit Vishwanathbuwa Jadhav  (1885−1964), direct disciple of Abdul Karim Khan.
 Sawai Gandharva (1886–1952), disciple of Abdul Karim Khan.
 Sureshbabu Mane (1902–1953), son and disciple of Abdul Karim Khan, also learned from Abdul Wahid Khan.
 Hirabai Barodekar (1905–1989), daughter of Abdul Karim Khan, also learned from Abdul Wahid Khan.
 Saraswati Rane (1913-2006), sibling and disciple of Sureshbabu Mane and Hirabai Badodekar.
 Gangubai Hangal (1913-2009), disciple of Sawai Gandharva.
Pandit Baburao Vishwanathbuwa Jadhav (1915-1976) son and direct disciple of Pandit Vishwanathbuwa jadhav and also a direct disciple of Ustad Abdul karim khan.
 Roshan Ara Begum (1917-1982), was also a disciple and relative of Abdul Karim Khan
 Firoz Dastur (1919-2008), disciple of Sawai Gandharva
Pandit Rajaram Vishwanathbuwa Jadhav (1921-1976) son and direct disciple of Pandit Vishwanathbuwa jadhav and also a direct disciple of Ustad Abdul karim khan.
 Pandit Vishwanath, 1957 - present , disciple of Pt. Mani prasad ji & Brother of Pt. Jagannath ji, Shehnai Vadak from Meerut Shehnai Gharana
 Bhimsen Joshi (1922-2011), disciple of Sawai Gandharva
Smt. Shakuntalaraje Rajaram Jadhav (1923-2004) wife and disciple of Pandit Rajaram Vishwanathbuwa Jadhav and also a direct disciple of har father- in-law "Proudh Gandharva" Pandit Vishwanathbuwa Jadhav    
 Prof Tej Bahadur Sahney (1936-2012) disciple of B N Dutta Lahorwale 
 Basavaraj Rajguru (1917-1991), disciple of Panchakshara Gawai, Sureshbabu Mane and Abdul Wahid Khan
 Madhava Gudi (1941-2011), disciple of Bhimsen Joshi
 Mashkoor Ali Khan (1957-Present), disciple of Shakoor Khan
 Nagaraj Rao Havaldar, disciple of Madhava Gudi
 Jayateerth Mevundi, disciple of Sripathi Padigar
 Manik Varma (1920-1996), disciple of Sureshbabu Mane and Hirabai Barodekar, also learned in other gharanas
 Milind Chittal, disciple of Firoz Dastur
 Prabha Atre (born 13 September 1932), disciple of Sureshbabu Mane and Hirabai Barodekar
 Sanhita Nandi, disciple of Mashkoor Ali Khan
 Sandip Bhattacharjee, disciple of Mashkoor Ali Khan and Mubarak Ali Khan
 Sumitra Guha, disciple of A. Kanan
 Balachandra Prabhu, disciple of Sripathi Padigar and Jayateerth Mevundi
 Girish Sanzgiri
 Mohd.Danish
 Mani Prasad (b. 1930)
 Rafiq Ahmed Khan (Sarangi)
 Nagnath Wodeyar (b. 1944)
 Pandit Pran Nath.
 Kaivalya Kumar Gurav
 Chhannulal Mishra
 Pandit Harish Tiwari
  Pandit Arun Bhaduri, disciple of Pandit A.Kanan and Abu Daud khan
  Shirin Sengupta Nath, disciple of Pandit A.Kanan and Pandit Arun Bhaduri
 Pandit Balkrishnabuwa Kapileshwari (1896-1982), senior disciple of Ustad Abdul Karim Khan 
 Pandit Chandrakant Kapileshwari (1935 - Present), disciple of Pandit BalKrishnabuwa Kapileshwari
 Shree Rani Madalsa (1957 - Present), Canadian disciple of Pandit Chandrakant Kapileshwari

21st Century
saqib ali khan
Sanjay Singh Patel
Dr Naveen Sharma 1985-2021

References

Bibliography

External links

 
Music schools in Pakistan
Music of Uttar Pradesh
13th-century establishments in India
Vocal gharanas